Herbert Klepp (born 14 May 1923) is an Austrian sprint canoeist who competed in the late 1940s and early 1950s. He won three medals at the ICF Canoe Sprint World Championships with a silver (K-4 1000 m: 1948) and two bronzes (K-1 4 x 500 m and K-4 1000 m: both 1950).

Klepp also competed at the 1948 Summer Olympics in London, earning his best finish tenth in the K-1 10000 m event. He also competed in the K-2 1000 m event, but was eliminated in the heats.

References

 

1923 births
Possibly living people
Austrian male canoeists
Canoeists at the 1948 Summer Olympics
Olympic canoeists of Austria
ICF Canoe Sprint World Championships medalists in kayak